Tsukuiko Shiroyama park (Japanese:県立津久井湖城山公園)is located in Kanagawa Prefecture in Japan. The park has an area of about 47.5 ha.

The park includes an exhibition hall and remnants of an old castle. Various wild brids are spotted in the park.

References

Parks and gardens in Kanagawa Prefecture